The 2022 ACC men's soccer tournament was the 36th edition of the ACC Men's Soccer Tournament. The tournament decided the Atlantic Coast Conference champion and guaranteed representative into the 2022 NCAA Division I men's soccer tournament. The final was played at Sahlen's Stadium in Cary, North Carolina.

The defending champions, Notre Dame was unable to defend their title, falling to Clemson in the first round. Clemson advanced to the final, becoming the lowest seed to do so in tournament history.  However, Clemson could not complete their improbable run, losing to Syracuse 2–0 in the final.  The victory was the second ACC Tournament title during Syracuse's time in the ACC and second title under head coach Ian McIntyre.

Qualification 

All twelve teams in the Atlantic Coast Conference will earn a berth into the ACC Tournament. The winners of each division, Atlantic and Coastal, will be seeds 1 and 2. The top 4 seeds received first round byes and hosted the winner of a first round game. The remaining 10 teams in the conference will be seeded according to points awarded in conference matches.  All rounds, with the exception of the final will be held at the higher seed's home field.  Seeding is determined by regular season conference record.  The seeding for the tournament was determined on the final day of conference play, October 28.

(*: division winners are automatically given the top two seeds).

Bracket 
*Note: Home team listed first.  Rankings shown are ACC Tournament Seeds.

Matches

First round

Quarterfinals

Semifinals

Final

Statistics

Goalscorers

All-Tournament team 

MVP in Bold

References 

2022
 
November 2022 sports events in the United States
2022 in sports in North Carolina